Peter John Kreeft (born March 16, 1937) is a professor of philosophy at Boston College and The King's College. A convert to Roman Catholicism, he is the author of over eighty books on Christian philosophy, theology and apologetics. He also formulated, together with Ronald K. Tacelli, Twenty Arguments for the Existence of God in their Handbook of Christian Apologetics.

Academic career
Kreeft was born March 16, 1937, in Paterson, New Jersey, the son of John and Lucy Kreeft. He took his AB at Calvin College (1959) and an MA at Fordham University (1961). He completed his doctoral studies in 1965, also at Fordham where he completed a dissertation under the direction of W. Norris Clarke. He subsequently completed his post-graduate studies at Yale University.

Kreeft joined the philosophy faculty of the Department of Philosophy of Boston College in 1965. He has debated several academics in issues related to God's existence. Shortly after he began teaching at Boston College he was challenged to a debate on the existence of God between himself and Paul Breines, an atheist and history professor, which was attended by a majority of undergraduate students. Kreeft later used many of the arguments in this debate to create the Handbook of Christian Apologetics with then undergraduate student Ronald K. Tacelli.

In 1971, Kreeft published an article titled "Zen In Heidegger's 'Gelassenheit'" in the peer-reviewed journal International Philosophical Quarterly, of Fordham University.  In 1994, he was an endorser of the document "Evangelicals and Catholics Together".  He also formulated, with R. Tacelli, "Twenty Arguments for the Existence of God".

Conversion story
Kreeft converted to Catholicism during his college years. A key turning point came when he was asked by a Calvinist professor to investigate the claims of the Catholic Church that it traced itself to the early Church. He said that, on his own, he "discovered in the early Church such Catholic elements as the centrality of the Eucharist, the Real Presence, prayers to saints, devotion to Mary, an insistence on visible unity, and apostolic succession."

The "central and deciding" factor for his conversion was "the Church's claim to be the one Church historically founded by Christ." He reportedly applied C. S. Lewis's trilemma (either Jesus is Lunatic, Liar, or Lord): "I thought, just as Jesus made a claim about His identity that forces us into one of only two camps ... so the Catholic Church’s claim to be the one true Church, the Church Christ founded, forces us to say either that this is the most arrogant, blasphemous and wicked claim imaginable, if it is not true, or else that she is just what she claims to be."

According to Kreeft's personal account, his conversion to Catholic Christianity was influenced by, among other things, Gothic architecture and Thomistic philosophy, the writings of St. John of the Cross, the logic of asking saints to pray for us, and a visit to St. Patrick's Cathedral in New York City when he was twelve years old, "feeling like I was in heaven ... and wondering why, if Catholics got everything else wrong, as I had been taught, they got beauty so right..."

Although a Catholic, he places central emphasis on the unity between Catholics and Protestants.

Bibliography

Books 

 
 Between Heaven and Hell (1982) — A Dialog with John F. Kennedy, C. S. Lewis, and Aldous Huxley
 The Unaborted Socrates (1983) — Socratic dialogue on abortion
 The Best Things in Life: (1984) — Twelve Socratic dialogues on modern life
 Yes or No? (1984) — Straight Answers to Tough Questions about Christianity Making Sense Out of Suffering (1986)
 Fundamentals of the Faith, Essays in Christian Apologetics (1988)
 Heaven, the Heart's Deepest Longing (1989)
 Everything You Ever Wanted To Know About Heaven... But Never Dreamed of Asking (1990)
 Making Choices: Practical Wisdom for Everyday Moral Decisions (1990)
 Summa of the Summa (1990) — Summa Theologica edited and explained for beginners
 Three Philosophies of Life (1990) — Ecclesiastes (life as vanity), Job (life as suffering), Song of Songs (life as love)
 Prayer: The Great Conversation (1991) — Straight answers to tough questions
 Back to Virtue (1992) — Reprint of For Heaven's Sake: The Rewards of the Virtuous Life (1986)
 Shorter Summa (1993) — Shorter version of Kreeft's Summa of the Summa Christianity for Modern Pagans: Pascal's Pensees (1993)
 Your Questions, God's Answers (1994) — Solid responses for Catholic teens
 Handbook of Christian Apologetics (with Ronald K. Tacelli) (1994)
 C. S. Lewis for the Third Millennium (1994) — Six essays on Lewis' Abolition of Man Shadow-Lands of C.S. Lewis: The Man Behind the Movie (1994)
 Handbook of Christian Apologetics (Pocket Version) (1994)
 The Angel and the Ants: Bringing Heaven Closer to Your Daily Life (1994)
 Talking to Your Children About Being Catholic (1995) — A treasure trove of ideas
 Angels (and Demons): What Do We Really Know About Them? (1995)
 Ecumenical Jihad: Ecumenism and the Culture Wars (1996)
 The Journey A Spiritual Roadmap For Modern Pilgrims (1996)
 The Snakebite Letters Devious Secrets for Subverting Society (1998)
 Refutation of Moral Relativism — Dialogues between a relativist and absolutist (1999)
 Prayer for Beginners (2000)
 Catholic Christianity (2001)
 Socrates Meets Jesus (1987/2002)— Socratic dialogue with students of Harvard University's Divinity School
 How to Win the Culture War: A Christian Battle Plan for a Society in Crisis (2002)
 Celebrating Middle Earth: Lord of the Rings (2002) — On western civilization
 Three Approaches to Abortion (2002)
 Philosophy 101 by Socrates (2002) — An introduction to philosophy via Plato's Apology
 Socrates Meets Machiavelli (2003) — Socratic dialogue between Socrates and Machiavelli
 Socrates Meets Marx (2003) — Socratic dialogue between Socrates and Karl Marx
 The God Who Loves You (2004)
 Socratic Logic (2005) — A textbook on classical logic
 You Can Understand the Bible (2005) — a combination of his previous books You Can Understand the Old Testament: A Book-by-Book Guide for Catholics (1990) and Reading and Praying the New Testament: A Book-by-Book Guide for Catholics (1992)
 Socrates Meets Sartre: Father Of Philosophy Meets The Founder of Existentialism (2005) — Socrates and Jean-Paul Sartre
 The Philosophy of Tolkien: The Worldview Behind "The Lord of the Rings" (2005)
 The Sea Within (2006) Socrates Meets Descartes (2007) — The Father of Philosophy Analyzes the Father of Modern Philosophy's Discourse on Method The Philosophy of Jesus (2007) — On the wisdom of Jesus
 Pocket Guide to the Meaning of Life (2007)
 Before I Go (2007) — Letters to Children About What Really Matters
 I Surf Therefore I Am (2008) — An exploration of Surfing
 Because God Is Real: Sixteen Questions, One Answer (2008)
 Jesus-Shock (2008)
 Socrates Meets Kant (2009) — The Father of Philosophy Meets His Most Influential Modern Child
 If Einstein Had Been a Surfer (2009) — A Philosophy of Surfing
 Between Allah & Jesus: what Christians Can Learn from Muslims (2010)
 Socrates Meets Hume (2010) — The Father of Philosophy Meets the Father of Modern Skepticism
 An Ocean Full of Angels (2011)
 Summa Philosophica (2012) — 110 Key Questions in Philosophy
 Jacob's Ladder (2013) — Ten Steps to Truth
 Charisms: Visions, Tongues, Healing, etc. (feat. Dave Nevins) (2013) — catalysts to "two-way" interactive prayer
 Socrates Meets Kierkegaard (2014) — Questions the founder of Christian existentialism52 Big Ideas (2020) — From 32 Great Minds
 Practical Theology (2014) — Spiritual Direction from Aquinas
 Letters to an Atheist (2014) — Wrestling with Faith
 The Philosopher's Bench (2015)(DVD) — Catholic philosophers Peter Kreeft and Thomas Howard bring philosophy to the 'man in the street'
 I Burned for Your Peace: Augustine's Confessions Unpacked (2016) — Snippets and commentary from one of the most beloved books in the world
 How to Be Holy (2016) — First Steps in Becoming a Saint
 Catholics and Protestants (2017) — What Can We Learn from Each Other?
 Between One Faith and Another (2017) — Engaging Conversations on the World's Great Religions
 Forty Reasons I am a Catholic (2018)
 Doors in the Walls of the World (2018) — Signs of Transcendence in the Human Story
 The Platonic Tradition (2018) 8 lectures "for beginners" on the essence of the Platonic tradition throughout philosophical history
 Socrates' Children'', 4 vols. (2019) — The 100 Greatest Philosophers

References

External links

Official website
A List of his Books
Writings at Catholic Educator's Resource

1937 births
20th-century American non-fiction writers
20th-century American philosophers
20th-century American Roman Catholic theologians
21st-century American non-fiction writers
21st-century American philosophers
21st-century American Roman Catholic theologians
Boston College faculty
Calvin University alumni
Catholic philosophers
Christian apologists
Converts to Roman Catholicism from Calvinism
Critics of atheism
Fordham University alumni
Living people
The King's College (New York City) faculty
Yale University alumni
American people of Dutch descent